The Journal of Cutaneous and Aesthetic Surgery is a triannual peer-reviewed open-access medical journal published by Medknow Publications on behalf of the Association of Cutaneous Surgeons of India. It covers research on skin surgery and aesthetic surgery. The editor-in-chief is  Imran Majid (Shri Maharaja Hari Singh Hospital), who succeeded Niti Khunger (Vardhman Mahavir Medical College).

Abstracting and indexing
The journal is abstracted and indexed in EBSCO databases, Expanded Academic ASAP, and Scopus.

References

External links

Dermatology journals
Open access journals
English-language journals
Triannual journals
Surgery journals
Medknow Publications academic journals
Academic journals associated with learned and professional societies